Shalimar Seiuli, (July 6, 1976 – April 22, 1998) known professionally as Shalimar or Atisone Seiuli, was an American-Samoan transgender dancer and public figure who gained infamy when she was seen getting into the car of the actor Eddie Murphy.

On May 2, 1997, Seiuli, a sex worker, was being watched by police before getting into Murphy's SUV. Seiuli was unaware of who the driver was. Murphy was pulled over by police, questioned for thirty minutes, then released, while Seiuli was arrested for an outstanding warrant on prostitution charges. Murphy claimed he was just being a "good Samaritan" by giving Seiuli a ride.

Overnight, the story made headlines, and was later parodied on an episode of Saturday Night Live. The National Enquirer paid Seiuli's $15,000 bond in exchange for exclusive details on her ride with Murphy.

Early life
Seiuli was born to a devout Mormon family in the village of Mesepa, American Samoa. From a young age Seiuli identified as female, adopting the name "Shalimar" after the imported French fragrance as a teenager. Seiuli was the cheerleading captain at Leone High School and was crowned Miss American Samoan Island Queen in 1993.
By 1996, Seiuli moved to Los Angeles, California, where she began her medical transition from male appearance to female appearance via hormone replacement therapy. She funded her transition through sex work on Santa Monica Boulevard, a street notorious for transgender prostitution.

Arrest and subsequent infamy
At 4:55 AM on May 2, 1997, Los Angeles Police officers followed and pulled over a Toyota Land Cruiser after watching Shalimar enter the vehicle. It was then discovered that the driver was actor Eddie Murphy. Murphy was questioned before being released because nothing illegal had occurred; however, Seiuli was arrested for an outstanding warrant for prostitution and sentenced to 90 days in jail. By morning, the story made international news, with the tabloid The National Enquirer paying Shalimar's fifteen thousand dollar bond in exchange for details on her arrest. "It's unfair I went to jail while Eddie Murphy walked away scot-free", she told the Enquirer. Murphy claimed he was just being a "good Samaritan" by offering Seiuli a ride home. He denied any premeditated intention to solicit a sex worker and denied knowing Seiuli was a "male prostitute". People reported that the truth of Murphy's account of events was being questioned due to the fact that "when stopped, he was some distance past Seiuli's reported residence," and there was no apparent reason for the actor to be in that area at that time other than soliciting sex.

Murphy hired Hollywood private eye Paul Barresi to help defuse the scandal, paying other trans women who had sold stories up to $15,000 per retraction. Seiuli claimed to have received threats since her encounter with Murphy, as she refused to change her story. Due to Seiuli's rising celebrity status, she filmed an erotic movie and left prostitution to become the House Madame of the nightclub, 7969, in which she performed erotic routines as a dominatrix with live snakes.

Death
On April 22, 1998, a neighbor in Seiuli's apartment building found her dead on the sidewalk outside the building. Discovered wearing only her bra, pants and a towel, police suspected Shalimar was locked out of her apartment, and tried to use a towel as a rope to slide or swing down from the roof to an open window. Instead, she  
fell five floors and suffered severe head trauma, resulting in her death, which was classified as accidental. The coroner's report stated someone heard a scream at 5 o'clock in the morning, which is believed to indicate the time of Seiuli's death.

References

External links

1998 deaths
American prostitutes
Transgender entertainers
Transgender women
1976 births
20th-century LGBT people
People from Western District, American Samoa
Accidental deaths from falls